The Swedish Museum of Natural History (literally, the National Museum of Natural History), in Stockholm, is one of two major museums of natural history  in Sweden, the other one being located in Gothenburg.

The museum was founded in 1819 by the Royal Swedish Academy of Sciences, but goes back to the collections acquired mostly through donations by the academy since its foundation in 1739. These collections had first been made available to the public in 1786. The museum was separated from the Academy in 1965.

One of the keepers of the collections of the academy during its earlier history was Anders Sparrman, a student of Carl Linnaeus and participant in the voyages of Captain James Cook. Another important name in the history of the museum is the zoologist, paleontologist and archaeologist Sven Nilsson, who brought the previously disorganised zoological collections of the museum into order during his time as keeper (1828–1831) before returning to Lund as professor.

The present buildings for the museum in Frescati, Stockholm, was designed by the architect Axel Anderberg and completed in 1916, topped with a dome.  it is the largest museum building in Sweden. The main campus of Stockholm University was later built next to the museum.

The museum has Sweden's first purpose-built IMAX Dome cinema called Cosmonova, which opened in a dedicated annex of the museum in 1993. The cinema is also the largest planetarium in Sweden.

The Index Herbariorum code assigned to this museum is S and it is used when citing housed specimens.

See also
 List of museums in Stockholm

References

External links 

 

1819 establishments in Sweden
Museums established in 1916
Natural history museums in Sweden
Museums in Stockholm
Natural history of Sweden
Science and technology in Sweden
Royal Swedish Academy of Sciences
Domes
National museums of Sweden
Museums established in 1819
Art Nouveau architecture in Stockholm
Art Nouveau museum buildings